Sommariva is a locality in the Shire of Murweh, Queensland, Australia.

Geography 
The Warrego Highway passes through the locality from east to west. The Western Railway line also passes through from east to west to the immediate south of the highway, with four railway stations within the locality (from west to east):

 Arabella railway station 
 Sommariva railway station
 Lurnea railway station (now abandoned)
 Angellala railway station

History 
The locality takes its name from its railway station, which was named by the Queensland Railways Department on 18 February 1911, using the name of an adjacent pastoral property, which presumably took its name from the town of Sommariva in Piedmont, Italy.

Heritage listings 
Sommariva has a number of heritage-listed sites, including the Angellala Rail Bridge on the Roma-Cunnamulla railway line.

Economy 
Sommariva is operated by Bill and Karen McLennan who grow and produce olives. Sommariva boasts the largest olive grove west of the Great Dividing Range. Sommariva olives, Olive Oil and Olive - derived products are marketed all over Southwest Queensland.

Education 
There are no schools in Sommariva. The nearest government primary schools are Charleville State School in neighbouring Charleville to the west and Morven State School in neighbouring Morven to the east. The nearest government secondary school is Charleville State High School in Charleville. Some parts of Sommariva are too distant from these schools for a daily commute; the other options are distance education or boarding school.

References

Shire of Murweh
Localities in Queensland